Kisurin is a Russian masculine surname, its feminine counterpart is Kisurina. Notable people with the surname include:

Anatoli Kisurin (born 1969), Russian football player
Evgeni Kisurin (born 1969), Russian basketball player

Russian-language surnames